Lists of Game Boy games cover video games developed for Nintendo's original Game Boy and for other platforms in the Game Boy family.

List of Game Boy games, for the original Game Boy
List of Game Boy Color games for games supporting the additional features of the Game Boy Color system
List of Game Boy Advance games 
List of Super Game Boy games for games supporting the additional features of the Super Game Boy peripheral
List of multiplayer Game Boy games
List of best-selling Game Boy video games

Game Boy games